Puruesh Chaudhary (born January 26, 1983 in Lahore, Pakistan) is a futures researcher, development and strategic narrative professional. She has a master's degree in International Negotiation and Policymaking from Graduate Institute of International and Development Studies in Geneva. She is also a Distinguished Fellow at the Institute of Strategic Studies Islamabad. Chaudhary is the founder and president of the non-governmental organization Agahi, a media development and capacity building initiative in Pakistan.

Chaudhary has been featured among the World's top female futurists as of January 2018. She has worked with multilateral donors and aid agencies, governmental sectors, news organizations and multinationals in Pakistan. The Pakistan Foresight Initiative is a project part of AGAHI developing frameworks aimed at improving policy making and strategic narratives; structures enabling legislators, strategists, academicians and the community developing shared understanding for effective implementation of decisions. Chaudhary has produced foresight research compilation on the Future of Pakistan up to 2060 and is published co-author of ‘The Future of Business,’ a critical insight on the rapidly changing world. Championing “shaping the future of journalism”, Puruesh has also co-founded Pakistan's annual journalism awards (The Agahi Awards); content analysis framework (Media Credibility Index and Ethical Media Audit); created foresight research fellowship opportunities with the Department of Defense and Strategic Studies of Quaid-e-Azam University. The Center of International Media Ethics’ honored her to serve as its Ambassador to Pakistan campaigning for quality journalism in the country.

Chaudhary is currently Member Board of Advisors for CIME and a Mentor for UN-Habitat Youth Fund Program. She continues to train and mentor journalists all across Pakistan on values and ethics. Chaudhary is an alumnus of the National Defence University and serves as a Committee Member on Media and Outreach. She is recognized as a Global Shaper by the World Economic Forum, as well as an ASPEN alumni, and a member of the World Futures Society. Chaudhary is on the Planning Committee of the Millennium-Project (Global Futures Studies and Research) representing the Pakistan Chair.

In 2012, Pruruesh Chaudhary gave a talk about the first steps of Agahi at TedxNUST in Islamabad, Pakistan.

References 

Futurologists
National Defence University, Pakistan alumni
1983 births
Graduate Institute of International and Development Studies alumni
Living people